Ribeauvillé (Alsatian: Rappschwihr) is a commune in the Haut-Rhin department in Grand Est in north-eastern France. It was a sub-prefecture of the department until 2015.

Its inhabitants are called Ribeauvillois.

Geography 
It lies at the base of the Vosges Mountains.

Climate
Ribeauvillé has a oceanic climate (Köppen climate classification Cfb).

History
Known in the 8th century as Rathaldovilare, the town passed from the Bishops of Basel to the Lords of Rappoltstein, who were among the most famous nobles in Alsace. The Lord of Rappoltstein was the King or Protector of the wandering minstrels of the land, who purchased his protection by paying him a tax.

When the family became extinct in 1673, this office of "King of the Pipers" (Pfeiferkönig) passed to the Counts Palatine of Zweibrücken-Birkenfeld. The minstrels had a pilgrimage chapel near Rappoltsweiler, dedicated to their patron saint, Maria von Dusenbach, and here they held an annual feast on 8 September. Ribeauvillé was known as Rappoltsweiler until 1918.

Sights
Ribeauvillé is in part surrounded by ancient walls, and has many picturesque medieval houses, and two old churches, of St Gregory and St Augustine, both fine Gothic buildings. The town hall contains a valuable collection of antiquities. (which held a great reputation in the Middle Ages), was re-discovered in 1888, and made Rappoltsweiler a watering-place.

Near the town are the ruins of three famous castles, Saint-Ulrich, Girsberg and Haut-Ribeaupierre, which formerly belonged to the lords of Ribeaupierre (or Rappoltstein).

The forest  of Ribeauvillé is home to the largest giant sequoia outside of the United States.

The former synagogue of the Jewish community is located on the Rue de la Synagogue and is currently used as the town's cinema.

Economy
The economy of Ribeauvillé is mainly based on:

 Tourism, because of its historical heritage and several festivals as, for example Fête des Ménétriers  or " Pfifferdaj" (first week-end of September) and Marché de Noël (Christmas);
 Viticulture: Ribeauvillé is located in the middle of the Alsace wineyards and is home to many viticulturists. Most of them are associated in a winemaking co-operative named Cave de Ribeauvillé (established 1895), one of the oldest in France;
 Manufacturing: There is the fabric printing factory Beauvillé and a Cordon Electronics factory located nearby.

Notable people
 Philipp Jakob Spener (1635–1705), Lutheran theologian
 Johann Baptist Wendling (1723–1797), flautist and composer
 Jean-Michel Beysser (1753–1794), French general
 Carl August von Steinheil (1801–1870), physicist
 Maurice Lévy (1838–1910), engineer
 Jean-François Klobb (1857–1899), French officer
 Hubert Keller, chef

See also
 Communes of the Haut-Rhin department

References

External links

 Tourist site
 Jewish Encyclopedia

Communes of Haut-Rhin
Subprefectures in France
Jewish communities